George Abbott Way is a section of West 45th Street west of Times Square between Seventh and Eighth Avenues in New York City, named for Broadway producer and director George Abbott. It is just east of Restaurant Row.

Notable buildings
The area home to a large concentration of Broadway theatres, many belonging to The Shubert Organization, including:
222 West 45th Booth Theatre
236 West 45th Gerald Schoenfeld Theatre
239 West 45th Music Box Theatre
242 West 45th Bernard B. Jacobs Theatre
249 West 45th Imperial Theatre
252 West 45th John Golden Theatre

The street is also occupied by large buildings on three corners:
New York Marriott Marquis hotel (northeast corner; houses the Marquis Theatre)
One Astor Plaza (southeast corner; houses the Minskoff Theatre)
Row NYC Hotel (southwest corner)

Theater District, Manhattan
Streets in Manhattan